Events from the year 1899 in France.

Incumbents
President: Félix Faure (until 18 February), Émile Loubet (starting 18 February)
President of the Council of Ministers: Charles Dupuy (until 22 June), Pierre Waldeck-Rousseau (starting 22 June)

Events
 18 February – Emile Loubet is elected president following the death of Felix Faure.
 16 April – Battle of Lougou, French victory in Niger.
 20 June – Right-wing nationalist movement Action Française formed by Maurice Pujo and Henri Vaugeois.
 17 July – The French Bretonnet-Braun mission is destroyed in the Battle of Togbao, in Chad, by the warlord Rabih az-Zubayr.
 19 September – Alfred Dreyfus is pardoned.
 28 October – Battle of Kouno, indecisive battle between French forces and a Muslim army led by Rabih az-Zubayr in Chad.
 Automobile manufacturer Renault established by Louis Renault and his brothers Marcel and Fernand.

Arts and literature
21 January – Actress Sarah Bernhardt, having taken over management of the Paris theatre which she renames the Théâtre Sarah-Bernhardt, opens in the title rôle of Victorien Sardou's La Tosca. On 20 May she premières a French adaptation of Shakespeare's Hamlet with herself in the title rôle, one of the first successful female actresses to tackle a male part.
 Henri Matisse paints Still Life with Compote, Apples and Oranges.
 Camille Pissarro takes an apartment overlooking the Tuileries Garden in Paris and produces a series of paintings of the view.

Sport
 31 August – The Olympique de Marseille association football club is founded.
 21 September – Henri François Béconnais sets the 1 km speed record (48 seconds) in a Soncin automobile at Achères.

Births

January to March
 6 January – Alphonse Castex, rugby union player (died 1969)
 7 January – Francis Poulenc, composer (died 1963)
 12 January – Pierre Bernac, baritone (died 1979)
 15 January – Louis Guilloux, writer (died 1980)
 20 January – Pierre Gandon, illustrator and engraver of postage stamps (died 1990)
 23 January – Pierre Grany, athlete (died 1968)
 7 February – René Crabos, rugby union player (died 1964)
 15 February – Georges Auric, composer (died 1983)
 21 February – Yvonne Vallée, actress (died 1996)
 25 February – Bernadette Cattanéo, trade unionist, communist activist, newspaper editor (died 1963)
 9 March – Jules Dewaquez, soccer player (died 1971)
 25 March – Jacques Audiberti, playwright, poet and novelist (died 1965)
 28 March – Bernard Delaire, last French naval veteran of the First World War (died 2007)

April to June
 7 April – Robert Casadesus, pianist (died 1972)
 11 April – Clément Dupont, rugby union player (died 1993)
 8 May – Jacques Heim, fashion designer (died 1967)
 14 May
 Pierre Victor Auger, physicist (died 1993)
 Pierre Petiteau, rugby union player (died 1974)
 15 May – Jean-Étienne Valluy, general (died 1970)
 17 May – Anita Conti, explorer, photographer and first French female oceanographer (died 1997)
 24 May – Suzanne Lenglen, tennis player (died 1938)
 20 June – Jean Moulin, prefect and Resistance leader (died in custody 1943)

July to September
 5 July
 Marcel Achard, playwright, screenwriter and author (died 1974)
Marcel Arland, novelist, literary critic and journalist (died 1986)
 7 July – Jean-Albert Grégoire, car pioneer (died 1992)
 14 July – Marie-Hélène Cardot, French resistance leader and politician (died 1977)
 19 July – Germaine Sablon, singer and actress (died 1985)
 26 July – Édouard Bader, rugby union player (died 1983)
 9 August – Armand Salacrou, dramatist (died 1989)
 14 August – Adolphe Bousquet, rugby union player (died 1972)
 28 August – Charles Boyer, actor (died 1978)
 9 September – Brassaï, photographer, sculptor and filmmaker (died 1984)
 14 September – Youenn Drezen, Breton nationalist writer and activist (died 1972)

October to December
 1 October – Joseph Guillemot, athlete and Olympic gold medallist (died 1975)
 5 October – Georges Bidault politician and resistance leader (died 1983)
 8 October – Edmond Michelet, politician (died 1970)
 24 October – Philippe Kieffer, Naval officer (died 1962)
 30 October – Georges Capdeville, soccer referee (died 1991)
 8 December
 Fernand Arnout, weightlifter and Olympic medallist (died 1974)
 François Borde, rugby union player (died 1987)
 9 December – Jean de Brunhoff, writer and illustrator (died 1937)

Full date unknown
 Marcel Fétique, bowmaker (died 1977)
 Henri-Robert Petit, journalist, Collaborationist under the Vichy regime and far-right activist (died 1985)

Deaths
 16 February – Félix Faure, President of France (born 1841)
 16 May – Francisque Sarcey, journalist and drama critic (born 1827)
 10 June – Ernest Chausson, composer (born 1855)
 5 July – Hippolyte Lucas, entomologist (born 1814)
 11 July – Charles Joseph Marty-Laveaux, literary scholar (born 1823)
 14 July – Jean-François Klobb, colonial officer (born 1857)
 20 July – Charlotte de Rothschild, socialite and painter (born 1825)
 25 September – Francisque Bouillier, philosopher (born 1813)
 28 November – Virginia Oldoini, Mistress of Napoleon III and significant figure in the early history of photography. (born 1837)

Full date unknown
 Henri Delaborde, art critic and painter (born 1811)

See also
 List of French films before 1910

References

1890s in France